Costin Maleș (born 25 July 1969) is a Romanian former professional footballer who played as a midfielder. Maleș played all his career only for Oțelul Galați, in which history he entered forever after 323 matches played and 41 goals scored. He retired at the end of the 2002-03 season, being awarded by the club, together with Cătălin Tofan, another legend of the red, white and blues that retired at the end of that season.

References

External links
 

1969 births
Living people
Sportspeople from Galați
Romanian footballers
Association football midfielders
Liga I players
Liga II players
ASC Oțelul Galați players